Tamney is a small village in Fanad in County Donegal, Ireland. It is sometimes spelt as Tawny or Tawney, and in the Irish language it is known as An Tamhnaigh. It was the only Postal town of the peninsula of Fanad (or Fannet/Fannett) in the late 18th and early 19th centuries, when its population was about 10,000 (now about 2,000).

In 1904 Seumas MacManus wrote a one-act play ''The Townland of Tamney''.

References 

Towns and villages in County Donegal